Exotic hadrons are subatomic particles composed of quarks and gluons, but which – unlike "well-known" hadrons such as protons, neutrons and mesons – consist of more than three valence quarks. By contrast, "ordinary" hadrons contain just two or three quarks. Hadrons with explicit valence gluon content would also be considered exotic. In theory, there is no limit on the number of quarks in a hadron, as long as the hadron's color charge is white, or color-neutral.

Consistent with ordinary hadrons, exotic hadrons are classified as being either fermions, like ordinary baryons, or bosons, like ordinary mesons. According to this classification scheme, pentaquarks, containing five valence quarks, are exotic baryons, while tetraquarks (four valence quarks) and hexaquarks (six quarks, consisting of either a dibaryon or three quark-antiquark pairs) would be considered exotic mesons. Tetraquark and pentaquark particles are believed to have been observed and are being investigated; Hexaquarks have not yet been confirmed as observed.

Exotic hadrons can be searched for by looking for S-matrix poles with quantum numbers forbidden to ordinary hadrons. Experimental signatures for such exotic hadrons have been seen by at least 2003 but remain a topic of controversy in particle physics.

Jaffe and Low suggested that the exotic hadrons manifest themselves as poles of the P matrix, and not of the S matrix. Experimental P-matrix poles are determined reliably in both the meson–meson channels and nucleon–nucleon channels.

History
When the quark model was first postulated by Murray Gell-Mann and others in the 1960s, it was to organize the states known then to be in existence in a meaningful way. As quantum chromodynamics (QCD) developed over the next decade, it became apparent that there was no reason why only three-quark and quark-antiquark combinations could exist. Indeed, Gell-Mann's original 1964 paper alludes to the possibility of exotic hadrons and classifies hadrons into baryons and mesons depending upon whether they have an odd (baryon) or even (meson) number of valence quarks. In addition, it seemed that gluons, the mediator particles of the strong interaction, could also form bound states by themselves (glueballs) and with quarks (hybrid hadrons). Several decades have passed without conclusive evidence of an exotic hadron that could be associated with the S-matrix pole.

In April 2014, the LHCb collaboration confirmed the existence of the Z(4430)−, discovered by the Belle experiment, and demonstrated that it must have a minimal quark content of cd.

Candidates

See also
Exotic matter
Exotic meson
Exotic baryon
Tetraquark
Pentaquark
Hexaquark

Notes

Hadrons
Hypothetical composite particles